Walter Dudley Seed Sr. (June 26, 1864 – December 3, 1959) was an American politician who served as the seventh Lieutenant Governor of Alabama from 1911 to 1915, and as Alabama State Treasurer from 1907 to 1911.

External links
Biography by the Alabama Department of Archives & History

Lieutenant Governors of Alabama
State treasurers of Alabama
1864 births
1959 deaths
Alabama Democrats